The Ira Webster Olive House is a historic two-story house in Lexington, Nebraska. It was built by Harry H. Mills in 1889-1890 for Ira Webster Olive, a cattleman, banker and businessman from Texas who lived in the house until his death in 1928. The house was designed in the Queen Anne style. It has been listed on the National Register of Historic Places since November 27, 1989.

References

National Register of Historic Places in Dawson County, Nebraska
Queen Anne architecture in Nebraska
Houses completed in 1889
1889 establishments in Nebraska